Gino Gallagher (c. 1963 – 30 January 1996) was an Irish republican who was Chief of Staff of the Irish National Liberation Army.

Murder
On the morning of 30 January 1996 Gallagher attended a social security office on the Falls Road where he signed on every two weeks. As he stood at the counter he was shot four times in the back of the head by a gunman and died instantly.

Gallagher's killing followed internal disagreements over the future of the republican socialist movement. The opposing "INLA-GHQ" faction, led by former Chief of Staff Hugh Torney disbanded in September of the same year following Torney's killing.

Kevin McAlorum, who was paid to kill Gallagher by Torney's faction, was himself murdered in 2004, although this was not linked to any political dispute.

References

External links
Hume raises Irish peace hopes The Independent, 31 January 1996

1963 births
1996 deaths
Deaths by firearm in Northern Ireland
Irish National Liberation Army members
Irish republicans
People killed during The Troubles (Northern Ireland)